Nysh is a rural locality (a selo) in Nogliksky District of Sakhalin Oblast, Russia, located on the Tym River,  south of Nogliki.

Transportation
If the rail link between Sakhalin and the mainland is built as planned, Nysh is to be the junction for the new railway with the island's existing network.

References

Rural localities in Sakhalin Oblast